"Hot Game" ( Hat Geim;  Hotto Gēmu) is a song by South Korean boy band A-Jax. It was released on July 11, 2012 as the group's second single. On August 9, Universal Sigma announced that the song was re-recorded in Japanese and would be released as the group's second Japanese single, on October 31, 2012.

Background
After the promotions of the single "One 4 U", DSP Media, group's label, started an event called "Wing Car Project", to the group meet their fans outside Seoul. A special truck was used to the group travel for the cities. The cities stated are Daegu on July 7, Busan on July 8 and Daejeon on July 9. In that same statement, it was also announced that the group will be releasing a new digital single in July. One day later, it was revealed a photo of the truck's back, revealing the name of the new single, titled "Hot Game". The song was first performed in Daegu's event. DSP Media also informed that the song will be promoted as "One 4 U" follow-up song.

Japanese version

On August 9, Universal Sigma and DSP Media announced that a Japanese re-recorded version of the song will serve as the group's second single. On September 28, Sigma updated the news with more details of the single, jacket covers and track listing. The single will be released in four editions: a CD+DVD, including the CD single and a DVD including the song's music video and a special off-shot video, a CD+Photobook edition, including the CD and a special photobook and two Regular editions: first press, with a cover of the song "A Song Calling Your Name", originally sung by SS501, as bonus track and a normal edition, including only the CD single with the normal track list.

Composition
The song was written by Kim Ji-hyang, also known for writing songs for the groups U-KISS, Girl's Day, for the artist Lee Hyori and more. It was composed by Steven Lee, same composed of the songs "One 4 U" and "Never Let Go", released by the group.

Music video

Korean version
The music video of the song was released simultaneously with the digital release of the song, on July 11. The music video features Kara's member Nicole Jung.

Promotions
The promotions of the song on TV music shows will start on July 12, on Mnet's M! Countdown. The song is also being promoted on the shows Music Core, Inkigayo, Show Champion and Music Bank.

Track listing

Chart performance

Korean version
The song debuted at number 59 on Gaon's Weekly singles chart, in the week of July 19, with 5.075.196 points. The song also charted in Gaon's Streaming and Download chart, in number 143 with 162.302 streams and in number 99 with 31.610 downloads, respectively.

Japanese version

Oricon

Release history

References

External links
 

2012 singles
Korean-language songs
Japanese-language songs
Dance-pop songs
2012 songs